Threshold knowledge is a term in the study of higher education used to describe core concepts—or threshold concepts—which, once understood, transform perception of a given subject, phenomenon, or experience.

The term was Introduced by Jan Meyer and Ray Land, Meyer and Land also discuss the related idea of troublesome knowledge, ideas that appear alien or counter-intuitive. The theory holds that:

These ideas have been explored by several subsequent researchers in a variety of disciplinary contexts including:
 International theory
 Science education
Economics
 Healthcare education
 Miscellaneous
 Statistics 
 Information literacy
Writing studies
The theory has also been criticised.

See also
Eureka effect
Tacit knowledge

References

External links
Threshold concept bibliography
ETL Project Occasional Report on threshold concepts and troublesome knowledge, by Meyer and Land

Higher education